Douglas Petrie is an American screenwriter, director, and producer. Best known as a writer, director, and co-executive producer on Buffy the Vampire Slayer. He co-wrote the screenplays for the Fantastic Four film and Harriet the Spy. He has also written for the television shows Angel, The 4400, Tru Calling and American Horror Story: Coven. He served as a co-executive producer and writer for two seasons on CSI: Crime Scene Investigation and as a consulting producer and writer on the second season of Pushing Daisies. He made a cameo on Joss Whedon's web-based film, Dr. Horrible's Sing-Along Blog, as "Professor Normal". He served as co-executive producer on the first season of the Netflix show Daredevil, and took over as showrunner for its second season alongside Marco Ramirez. In April 2016 Petrie and Ramirez were announced as showrunners of The Defenders, a miniseries that crosses over Daredevil, Jessica Jones, Luke Cage, and Iron Fist.

Early years
Petrie earned his Bachelor of Arts in English from William & Mary in 1985.

Buffy the Vampire Slayer and Angel credits
Petrie joined the Buffy writing staff in season three as a story editor. He was promoted to executive story editor in season four, co-producer in season five, supervising producer in season six, and finally co-executive producer midway through season seven.

Buffy the Vampire Slayer
"Revelations"
"Bad Girls"
"Enemies"
"The Initiative"
"This Year's Girl"
"The Yoko Factor"
"No Place Like Home"
"Fool for Love"
"Checkpoint" (co-written with Jane Espenson)
"The Weight of the World"
"Flooded" (also director; co-written with Jane Espenson)
"As You Were" (also director)
"Two to Go"
"Beneath You"
"Bring on the Night" (co-written with Marti Noxon)
"Get It Done" (also director)
"End of Days" (co-written with Jane Espenson)

Angel
"In the Dark"
"The Trial" (teleplay; co-written with Tim Minear from a story by David Greenwalt)

Comics
Broken Bottle of Djinn, 1937
Nikki Goes Down!
Double Cross
Bad Dog
Living Doll
Ring of Fire

See also
Mutant Enemy Productions

References

External links

American comics writers
American film directors
American male screenwriters
American television directors
American television producers
American television writers
College of William & Mary alumni
Living people
Place of birth missing (living people)
Year of birth missing (living people)
American male television writers